The 2020 British Indoor Athletics Championships was the national indoor track and field competition for British athletes, held on 22 and 23 February 2020 at the Emirates Arena in Glasgow, Scotland.

Medal summary

Men

Women

References 

British Indoor Championships
British Indoor Athletics Championships
Sports competitions in Glasgow
Athletics Indoor
Athletics competitions in Scotland
British Indoor Athletics Championships